The Udmurt Autonomous Oblast was formed on 4 November 1920 as the Votyak Autonomous Oblast, "Votyak" being an obsolete name for the Udmurt people.  It was renamed Udmurt Autonomous Oblast on 1 January 1932 and was reorganized into the Udmurt ASSR on 28 December 1934.  This became the Udmurt Republic on 20 September  1990.

See also
First Secretary of the Udmurt Communist Party

References

Autonomous oblasts of the Soviet Union
History of Udmurtia
States and territories established in 1932
States and territories disestablished in 1934
1932 establishments in the Soviet Union
1934 disestablishments in the Soviet Union